Area is a peer-reviewed academic journal published by  Wiley-Blackwell on behalf of the Royal Geographical Society. According to the Journal Citation Reports, the journal has a 2014 impact factor of 1.203.

References

External links 
 

Geography journals
Royal Geographical Society
Wiley-Blackwell academic journals
Quarterly journals
English-language journals
Publications established in 1969
Academic journals associated with learned and professional societies of the United Kingdom